The year 1919 in archaeology involved some significant events.

Events
 22 May: A. E. Douglass provides the first comparative dendrochronology datings, to Clark Wissler of the American Museum of Natural History for sites in New Mexico.

Explorations
 Julio C. Tello makes the first scientific survey of Chavin de Huantar in Peru.
 Late: Col. William Hawley begins work at Stonehenge in England.

Excavations
 St Piran's Old Church, Perranzabuloe, Cornwall, England.
 Excavation of Tell al-'Ubaid in Mesopotamia by Henry Hall of the British Museum begins.
 1919–1921: Graig Lwyd Neolithic stone axe factory in North Wales.

Finds
 12 May: Traprain Treasure of Roman silver found in Scotland.

Publications
 Katherine Routledge – The Mystery of Easter Island: the story of an expedition.

Births
 13 March: Mualla Eyüboğlu, Turkish restoration architect (died 2009).
 23 October: Manolis Andronikos, Greek archaeologist (died 1992).

Deaths
 1 October: Francis J. Haverfield, English Romano-British archaeologist (born 1860).
 22 November: Sir Guy Francis Laking, keeper of the London Museum (born 1875).

References

Archaeology
Archaeology
Archaeology by year